The Hays House is a historic home located at 324 South Kenmore Avenue, Bel Air, Harford County, Maryland, United States. It is a frame -story house with a gambrel roof, likely built in 1788 with an addition in 1811. The house was moved in 1960, and stands on a modern concrete-block foundation. The Hays House is owned by The Historical Society of Harford County and today the Hays House Museum offers visitors a glimpse into the life of an affluent family in late 18th century Bel Air.

The Hays House was listed on the National Register of Historic Places in 1980.

References

External links
 - official site of the Hays House Museum 
 - official site of The Historical Society of Harford County
, including photo from 1998, Maryland Historical Trust website

Houses on the National Register of Historic Places in Maryland
Houses in Bel Air, Harford County, Maryland
Houses completed in the 18th century
Historic house museums in Maryland
Museums in Harford County, Maryland
National Register of Historic Places in Harford County, Maryland